Jacob Hamblin (April 2, 1819 – August 31, 1886) was a Western pioneer, a missionary for the Church of Jesus Christ of Latter-day Saints (LDS Church), and a diplomat to various Native American tribes of the Southwest and Great Basin. He aided European-American settlement of large areas of southern Utah and northern Arizona, where he was seen as an honest broker between Latter-day Saint settlers and the Natives. He is sometimes referred to as the "Buckskin Apostle," or the "Apostle to the Lamanites." In 1958, he was inducted into the Hall of Great Westerners of the National Cowboy & Western Heritage Museum.

Early life and family
Hamblin was born in Salem, Ohio, to a family of farmers. He grew up learning farming. He was baptized a member of Church of Christ on March 3, 1842, at the age of 22.

Hamblin and his first wife, Lucinda, had four children. When Hamblin proposed moving west with the Latter Day Saints to the Salt Lake Valley, Lucinda refused to go. In February 1849, Hamblin and Lucinda decided to end their marriage, and he continued west without her, taking the four children with him. In September, Hamblin met and married Rachel Judd, a widow, in Council Bluffs, Iowa. He and Rachel had five children. Hamblin lived the Mormon doctrine of plural marriage, and he married Sarah Priscilla Leavitt on September 11, 1857, Eliza Hamblin on February 14, 1863 (see Todd Compton, book) with whom he had one child, Clara Melvina Hamblin B. Nov. 5, 1876 (their daughter was raised by Priscilla after Eliza left Jacob for Paiute Poinkum), and Louisa Bonelli on November 16, 1865. With Leavitt he had 14 children and also raised Clara (https://www.ancestry.com/genealogy/records/sarah-priscilla-leavitt-24-j7dt0), and with Bonelli he had 6 children. Leavitt and Bonelli were sealed to him in the Endowment House in Salt Lake City.

Conversion to Mormonism and migration west
As an adult, Hamblin and his family lived in Spring Prairie, Wisconsin. Hamblin was injured and thought he would die of his wound. Hamblin prayed that if he survived, he would serve God the rest of his life. Soon after, a woman knocked on his door who said she had felt called to go to his house. A nurse, she had the medicines and poultices needed, and helped heal Hamblin's wound and saved his life.

From then on Hamblin turned to God. In 1842, he and his children converted to Mormonism. They moved from Wisconsin to Nauvoo, Illinois, where the Latter Day Saints had gathered.

After Joseph Smith's death, Hamblin witnessed the succession crisis among the Mormons. He became a supporter of Brigham Young for the leadership of the church and, with the majority of its members, affiliated himself with the LDS Church. In his memoir, Hamblin wrote of the moment he decided to support Young:

"On the 8th of August, 1844, I attended a general meeting of the Saints. Elder Rigdon was there, urging his claims to the Presidency of the Church. His voice did not sound like the voice of the true shepherd. When he was about to call a vote of the congregation to sustain him as President of the Church, Elders Brigham Young, Parley P. Pratt and Heber C. Kimball (all members of the Quorum of the Twelve) stepped into the stand. Brigham Young remarked to the congregation: 'I will manage this voting for Elder Rigdon. He does not preside here. This child' (meaning himself) 'will manage this flock for a season.' The voice and gestures of the man were those of the Prophet Joseph. The people, with few exceptions, visibly saw that the mantle of the Prophet Joseph Smith had fallen upon Brigham Young. To some it seemed as though Joseph again stood before them. I arose to my feet and said to a man sitting by me, 'That is the voice of the true shepherd—the chief of the Apostles'."

 Hamblin was a Mormon pioneer and in 1850 settled in Tooele, near Salt Lake City. He became well known for creating good relations between the white settlers and Indians. After an altercation, when his gun failed to fire as he shot at an Indian, Hamblin said God had revealed he was to be a "messenger of peace" to the Indians, and that if he did not thirst for their blood, he should never fall by their hands. In 1854, Hamblin was called by President Young to serve a mission to the southern Paiute Indians and settled at Santa Clara in the vicinity of the modern city of St. George, Utah.

Hamblin's first home in Sant Clara was destroyed by a flash flood. His second wife, Rachael, saved one of their young children from drowning, but the child died soon after from exposure. Rachael never fully recovered from the exposure she got from the flood. Swearing to avoid the risk of flood, Hamblin built a new home on a hill in Santa Clara. Owned today by the LDS Church, the house is operated as a museum, where Mormon missionaries give tours daily.

Utah War and the Mountain Meadows massacre

In August 1857, Brigham Young made Hamblin president of the Santa Clara Indian Mission. Young directed Hamblin by letter to

continue the conciliatory policy towards the Indians which I have ever commended, and seek by works of righteousness to obtain their love and confidence. Omit promises where you are not sure you can fill them; and seek to unite the hearts of the brethren on that mission, and let all under your direction be united together in holy bonds of love and unity.

Young had become aware in July of an approaching United States army ordered to invade the Utah Territory to put down a supposed "rebellion" among the Mormons. Anticipating what would become known as the Utah War, Young urged Hamblin to "not permit the brethren to part with their guns and ammunition, but save them against the hour of need." He wrote to Hamblin that the Indians "must learn to help us or the United States will kill us both."

In late August, Hamblin traveled north to Salt Lake City with George A. Smith, of the church's First Presidency, who had been dispatched to the southern Mormon colonies to warn of the approaching U.S. army and recommend against colonists' trading with non-Mormons then traveling through their territory. At Corn Creek near Fillmore, Utah, Smith, Hamblin, and Thales Haskell encountered the Baker–Fancher party, a wagon train of Arkansans en route to California. Hamblin suggested to them that they stop further south in the grassy Mountain Meadows, where he maintained a homestead at a traditional stopping point on the Old Spanish Trail from New Mexico to California.

Hamblin and his party continued on to Salt Lake City, where he stayed for roughly a week to "conduct Indian business and take a plural wife." This "Indian business" included bringing a delegation of Southern Paiute to meet with LDS Church leaders. In Salt Lake City, Hamblin reported later that he was told that the Fanchers had "behaved badly" and had "robbed hen-roosts, and been guilty of other irregularities, and had used abusive language to those who had remonstrated with them. It was also reported that they threatened, when the army came into the north end of the Territory, to get a good outfit from the weaker settlements in the south."

By one account, Hamblin was on his way home and was met by his adopted Indian son, Albert, who recounted the horror of the slaughter of the Baker–Fancher Party in the infamous Mountain Meadows massacre. In fact, on his trail south, he also met John D. Lee who was on his way to Salt Lake City. In both his autobiography and his testimony at the second trial of Lee for the massacre, Hamblin claimed that to his great distress, Lee admitted to him his role in the killings along with other Mormons, although he placed the blame for the attack on the Paiutes. Many accept Hamblin's account of his meeting with Lee because Hamblin was well known for honesty. (Professor A. H. Thompson of the U.S. Geological survey once said, "I would trust my money, my life and my honor in the keeping of Jacob Hamblin, knowing all would be safe"),

As Hamblin continued south towards Santa Clara, he was told that a band of Paiutes was planning to attack a second wagon train, the Duke party. Perhaps believing Lee's account that the Indians were primarily responsible for the Mountain Meadows massacre, he quickly returned south to prevent another slaughter. He recounts that he did not himself overtake that wagon train, but as he had been traveling very quickly without sleep he sent Samuel Knight and Dudley Leavitt before him. Knight and Leavitt overtook the train and were able to negotiate with the Paiutes wherein the Indians took the trains' loose cattle (nearly 500 head) and left the train in peace. Knight and Leavitt continued with the company and saw it safely through to California. Hamblin was later able to return that stock to the Duke party after conferring with those Indians involved.

Upon reaching the massacre site, the diary of Sarah Priscilla Leavitt, Hamblin's third wife, recounts the horrors of her lying in the covered wagon as they got to the scene. Although Hamblin warned her to not look out, she peeked for a few seconds, which she always regretted. The remaining children that survived (some accounts say 17, some say 20) were brought to the Hamblin home that night. Sarah cared for three of the children herself. Eventually, federal agents returned all the children to their Arkansas relatives. Brevet Major J. H. Carelton interviewed Albert, who gave a detailed account of what he saw of the massacre. Later, he was found lying face down dead in a cactus. Sarah wrote in her diary that both she and Hamblin felt his knowledge of what really happened at the massacre resulted in his murder.

Hamblin spent the rest of 1857 and early 1858 shepherding non-Mormons through Utah on the trail to California and Mormons returning to Utah from outlying settlements in order to participate in its defense should the army attack.

After the conclusion of the Utah War, Hamblin claims to have been willing to testify to his knowledge of the massacre at the behest of George A. Smith. However, due to the amnesty proclaimed by the President of the United States to the Mormons, the new governor, Alfred Cumming, did not wish to discuss the matter. Hamblin did, however, testify at Lee's second trial for the massacre in 1876.

Later missions to Native Americans

In 1858, while he was in Salt Lake City, Hamblin was made a sub-Indian agent. That same year he was called on a mission to the Moquis (Hopis) of northern Arizona. He traveled southeast through Pipe Springs, crossed the Buckskin Mountain (Kaibab Plateau), and forded the Colorado River at the Crossing of the Fathers which is now under Lake Powell at Padre Bay. This was somewhat north of the later crossing at Lee's Ferry which he discovered. Upon his arrival at the village of Oraibi, he was told by the Hopis that it was prophesied that he and his companions would come and bring the Hopi knowledge which they formerly had. However, they were also told that the Hopi would not cross over the Colorado River to live with the Mormons until the three prophets which had led them to their mesas returned to give them further instructions. (See Hopi mythology). The Hopi also questioned why they should cross the Colorado River to meet the Mormons when they would soon have settlements to their south in any case. At the time there were no plans for Mormon settlements to the south of the Hopi, although Hamblin helped found Mormon settlements on the Little Colorado River years later.

Hamblin went home, but returned on several occasions to keep up good relations with the Hopis and the Navajos. In 1862, three Hopi men accompanied him to Salt Lake City to meet Brigham Young. In 1870 he brought a minor Hopi leader, Toova, and his wife across the Colorado River to visit the Mormon settlements in southern Utah. Tuba eventually joined the LDS Church, and invited the Mormons to settle near his village of Moencopi where they founded Tuba City, named in honor of their Hopi friend.

Earl Spendlove's article, "Let Me Die in Peace," states that Hamblin originally purchased Eliza, a Paiute from Utah of the Shivwit or Cedar Band, to free her from slavery.  Hamblin adopted Eliza when she was a teen. Hamblin and Eliza bore one child, a girl named Clara Melvina Hamblin, on November 5, 1876 (see Autobiography of Sarah Priscilla Hamblin donated by Sharon Black).  Jacob later took wives Priscilla and Louisa, along with Mary Elizabeth, Clara Melvina, Jake (Jacob Jr.), and the rest of his children to Kanab, Utah.  A Paiute known as Old Poinkum had run off with Hamblin's bride Eliza and hid her in New Harmony Valley, Utah; Eliza left her baby girl Clara with Jacob and Priscilla.  Later, after Priscilla Hamblin left Nutrioso ranch in Arizona, she and Jacob moved to Eagar, then Alpine, Arizona.  Priscilla never told Clara Melvina about her mother Eliza (whom Jacob nicknamed "Suzie").  However, Priscilla's children eventually figured out that Clara was not Priscilla's biological child, as Priscilla had coal black hair and did not look like the like Priscilla's other children.  Louisa Hamblin later wrote to her daughter that she had knit a pair of "pink stockings" for "Eliza's baby".

Hamblin was an invaluable diplomat between the Latter-day Saints and the Native Americans, surviving numerous dangerous encounters between the two. In 1870 he also acted as an adviser to John Wesley Powell before his second journey through the Grand Canyon. Hamblin acted as a negotiator to ensure safety for Powell's expedition from local Native tribes. Powell related that Hamblin "speaks [the Indians'] language well and has great influence over the Indians in the region round about. He is a silent, reserved man, and when he speaks it is in a slow, quiet way that inspires great awe." Said a Native Chief to Powell, "We believe in Jacob, and look upon you as a father .... We will tell [the other Indians] that [Powell] is Jacob's friend."

Hamblin attributed much of his success with the Indians to his conviction that he "had received from the Lord an assurance that I should never fall by the hands of the Indians, if I did not thirst for their blood." Indeed, on many occasions, Hamblin dealt with hostile Indians with no companion and carrying no weapon to defend himself. During one particularly trying period in 1874, three Navajo Indians were shot by a member of the Butch Cassidy gang in central Utah. Hamblin had previously promised the Navajos they could safely trade with the Mormons in that area, and Mormons were falsely blamed for the killing. Hamblin was asked by Brigham Young to talk with the angry Navajos and avert war, but Hamblin's local bishop made two desperate attempts to keep him from walking into a "certain death-trap". Hamblin refused to return home, stating that "I have been appointed to a mission by the highest authority of God on Earth [Brigham Young]. My life is but of small moment compared with the lives of the Saints and the interests of the Kingdom of God." One eye-witness to the events that followed, reported that "no braver man ever lived." Hamblin offered his rules for dealing with the Indians as follows:

I never talk anything but the truth to them.
I think it useless to speak of things they cannot comprehend.
I strive by all means to never let them see me in a passion.
Under no circumstances show fear, thereby showing to them that I have a sound heart and a straight tongue.
Never approach them in an austere manner nor use more words than are necessary to convey my ideas, not in a higher tone of voice than to be distinctly heard.
Always listen to them when they wish to tell of their grievances, and redress their wrongs, however trifling they may be if possible. If I cannot I let them know I have a desire to do so.
I never allow them to hear me use profane or obscene language or take any unbecoming course with them.
I never submit to any unjust demands or submit to coercion under any circumstances, thereby showing them that I govern and am governed by the rule of right not by might.

Hamblin added, "I believe if the rules that I have mentioned were observed there should be little difficulty on our frontier with the Red Man." He treated the Native Americans as intelligent equals. He said, "some people call the Indians superstitious. I admit the fact, but do not think that they are more so than many who call themselves civilized. There are few people who have not received superstitious traditions from their fathers. The more intelligent part of the Indians believe in one Great Father of all; also in evil influences, and in revelation and prophecy; and in many of their religious rites and ideas, I think they are quite as consistent as the Christian sects of the day."

Hamblin kept a home in Kanab, Utah (Kanab's city park is named Jacob Hamblin Park). Hamblin started a ranch in the House Rock Valley in the Arizona Strip at the base of the Vermillion Cliffs. Jacob Lake, Arizona, on the Kaibab Plateau north of the Grand Canyon is named after him, as is Jacob Hamblin Arch in Coyote Gulch and Hamblin Wash along U.S. Highway 89 in northern Arizona.

See also
 Lee-Hamblin family
 Ira Hatch

Notes

References

External links

 Register of the Jacob Hamblin Journal, 1868-1886, a collection of Hamblin papers held at Brigham Young University's L. Tom Perry Special Collections
 The Jacob Hamblin Legacy Organization, Inc., a group of descendants of Jacob Hamblin
 The Jacob Hamblin Memorial Committee, a group of Southern Utah residents raising money to build a memorial to Hamblin in Kanab, Utah

1819 births
1886 deaths
19th-century Mormon missionaries
American Mormon missionaries in the United States
Converts to Mormonism
People from Coconino County, Arizona
History of the Latter Day Saint movement
Mormonism and Native Americans
Mormon pioneers
Mountain Meadows Massacre
People from Kanab, Utah
People from Tooele County, Utah
People of the Utah War
People from Salem, Ohio
Mission presidents (LDS Church)
American leaders of the Church of Jesus Christ of Latter-day Saints
Latter Day Saints from Utah
Latter Day Saints from Ohio
People from Santa Clara, Utah